Kyōka ("wild" or "mad poetry") is a popular, parodic subgenre of the tanka form of Japanese poetry with a metre of 5-7-5-7-7.  The form flourished during the Edo period (17th–18th centuries) and reached its zenith during the Tenmei era (1781–89).

Background

In much the way poets in the kanshi style (Chinese poetry by Japanese poets) wrote humorous kyōshi poems, poets in the native Japanese waka style composed humorous poems in the 31-metre style.  Tanaka Rokuo suggests the style may have drawn inspiration from gishōka ("playful and mocking verse"), poetry that targeted guests at banquets where they were read out in an atmosphere similar to that of a roast.

During the Edo period (17th–19th centuries) there were two major branches of kyōka; one based in Edo (modern Tokyo), and Naniwa kyōka in the Kansai region.  Naniwa kyōka arose in Kyoto in the 16th century, at first practised by aristocrats such as Matsunaga Teitoku (1571–1654).  It later found practitioners amongst commoners and centred in Osaka, whose earlier name Naniwa lent its name to the regional form.

In the late 18th century, the economic policies of senior councillor Tanuma Okitsugu led to a sense of liberation, and various publishing forms flourished during this time. The earliest and largest collection was the Manzai kyōka-shū ("Wild Poems of Ten Thousand Generations") that Akara edited and had published in 1783. Kyōka in Edo reached its zenith during the Tenmei era (1781–89). The form attracted those from the various social classes, including low-level samurais, commoners such as merchants, and scholars of Chinese and Japanese classics. Though its popularity spread to commoners, kyōka required considerable classical education and thus reached a limited audience; its popularity did not last into the modern era.

Numerous kyōka poems appear throughout Jippensha Ikku's comic kokkeibon novel Tōkaidōchū Hizakurige (1802–22).

Form

Kyōka poetry derives its form from the tanka, with a metre of 5-7-5-7-7.

Most of the humour lies either in placing the vulgar or mundane in an elegant, poetic setting, or by treating a classical subject with common language or attitudes.  Puns, wordplay, and other word games were frequently employed—and make translation difficult.  A common technique was honkadori, in which a classical poem was taken as a base (or honka ) and altered to give it a vulgar twist.  Other common techniques include  (intertextually associated words),  kakekotoba (pivot words), and mitate (figurative language).  The makurakotoba epithets common to waka are not used in kyōka.

The following example demonstrates how Ki no Sadamaru (1760–1841) used a well-known waka poem by the classical poet Saigyō (1118–1190) from the Shin Kokin Wakashū (1205) as a honka:

In the original, Saigyō had broken a branch from a cherry tree on Mount Yoshino in modern Nara to remind himself of a prime cherry-viewing spot; when he returns the next year, he chooses instead to go cherry-blossom viewing in an area he had not been to before.  Ki no Sadamaru parodies the original by changing a few syllables, so that the poet finds himself wandering around, unable to find the branch he had broken.

Notes

References

Works cited

External links
Examples of kyōka

Japanese literary terminology
Japanese literature
Japanese poetry
Articles containing Japanese poems
Waka (poetry)
Humorous poems
Satirical poems